Wyoming Highway 31 (WYO 31) is a  Wyoming state highway known locally as Cold Springs Road. Located in southern Big Horn County, the highway serves the town of Manderson and the community (CDP) of Hyattville.

Route description
Wyoming Highway 31 is an east-west highway that starts in the town of Manderson at US 16/US 20/WYO 789 and heads north through Manderson as Sherman and Marshall Streets, but turns east as it leaves the town to head toward Hyattville. In addition Medicine Lodge State Archaeological Site  in Hyattville can also be reached by using Highway 31. Nearing its end, WYO 31 turns south and enters the community of Hyattville and passes through the community as Main Street. The Highway 31 designation ends south of Hyattville. The roadway continues as Big Horn CR R49.

Major intersections

References

 Official 2003 State Highway Map of Wyoming

External links 

 Wyoming State Routes 000-099
 WYO 31 - US-16/US-20/WYO 789 to Hyattville/CR R49
 Medicine Lodge State Archaeological Site

Transportation in Big Horn County, Wyoming
031